Flunitrazolam (FNTZ, Flunazolam) is a triazolobenzodiazepine (TBZD), which are benzodiazepine (BZD) derivatives, that has been sold online as a designer drug, and is a potent hypnotic and sedative drug similar to related compounds such as flunitrazepam, clonazolam and flubromazolam. It was first definitively identified and reported to the EMCDDA Early Warning System, by an analytical laboratory in Germany in October 2016, and had not been described in the scientific or patent literature before this. It is the triazole analogue of Flunitrazepam (Rohypnol). The addition of the triazole ring to the scaffold increases potency significantly, this is evident as flunitrazolam is reported anecdotally to be active in the microgram level. It is active at 0.1 mg.

See also
 List of benzodiazepines

References

Nitrobenzodiazepines
Designer drugs
GABAA receptor positive allosteric modulators
Triazolobenzodiazepines